Overdraw may refer to:

 overdraft, to draw more money than there is in a bank account
 overdrafting, the term in hydrology
 overdraw (dominoes), to draw more than the allowed number of tiles in dominoes
 overblowing, to overdraw in harmonica playing
 fillrate, to overdraw in computer graphics